Börje Karl Anders Sunna (born 11 April 1985) is a Swedish Sámi artist known for incorporating a strong political point of view into his artwork.
Sunna was born in the Jukkasjärvi parish of Kiruna, Norrbotten County, Sweden. He grew up in a reindeer herding family in  near the border of Finland and was educated at Academy of Fine Arts, Umeå and the Konstfack University of Arts, Crafts and Design. Nowadays he lives in Jokkmokk, Sweden.

Sunna's art is political, often focusing on Sámi history and his family's long-standing conflict with the county administrative board's reindeer husbandry delegation. In his work, Sunna uses thick layers of color, graffiti techniques, collage, and prints with motifs depicting oppression of the Sámi, including forced relocations and photographs from the Swedish State Institute for Racial Biology. In 2013, Sunna drew criticism from some Sámi for his use of the Sámi flag as a canvas for a graffiti-style painting of a skull-faced Sámi man holding an AK-47.

In addition to painting, Sunna works with larger installations. In some exhibitions, he collaborates with the artist and photographer Michiel Brouwer.

Sunna co-directed with Inga-Wiktoria Påve the 2017 animated short film  (Wake Up Elena Wake Up!), which won the Jane Glassco Award for Emerging Talent at the 2017 imagineNATIVE Film and Media Arts Festival in Toronto and Best Indigenous Short Film award at the 2018  in Finland.

Sunna is one of the artists representing Sápmi in the Nordic pavilion during the 2022 Venice Biennale.

Selected exhibitions
A partial list of solo and group exhibitions featuring Sunna's work.
 Sámi Pavilion, 59th Venice Biennale, Venice, Italy — 2022
 Varje löv är ett öga with Michiel Brouwer, Göteborgs Konsthall, Gothenburg, Sweden — 2019–2020
 Modernautställningen, Moderna Museet, Stockholm, Sweden — 2018
 Maadtoe with Michiel Brouwer, Kristinehamn, Sweden — 2016–2017
 SAAMELAISTA nykytaidetta = Dálá SÁMI dáidda = SÁMI Contemporary travelling exhibition, 7 March 2014 – 27 September 2015
 , Korundi, Finland — 7 March – 25 May 2014
 Norrbottens Museum, Luleå, Sweden — 18 June – 24 August 2014
 , Karasjok, Norway — 14 November 2014 – 4 January 2015
 Felleshus, Berlin, Germany — 9 July – 27 September 2015
 Area Infected, Bildmuseet, Umeå, Sweden — 2014
 Institut Tessin, Paris, France — 2014
 Greetings from Sápmi, Jamtli, Östersund, Sweden — 2013
 Norrbottens Ambassad för Konst, Stockholm, Sweden — 2013
 Liljevalchs konsthall, Stockholm, Sweden — 2012

References

External links 
 Official site
 ArtFacts profile

1985 births
Living people
Sámi artists
Sámi activists
21st-century Swedish artists
Swedish art